"Battle Cry of Peace" is a World War I-era song composed by William Donaldson with lyrics by Henry T. Bruce. It was published by F.B. Haviland Publishing Company in 1916.

Copyrights
"Battle Cry of Peace" was entered into the Library of Congress' Catalog of Copyright Entries on March 6, 1916 under the F.B. Haviland Publishing Company.

References

Peace songs
Anti-war songs
1916 songs
Songs of World War I